Number Three may refer to:

No. 3, a 1997 South Korean gangster comedy film
Nº3, an album by Dot Hacker
Number Three (Battlestar Galactica), a character from the re-imagined Battlestar Galactica television series
3 (number), a number, numeral, and glyph
A character from the television series The Prisoner
Numbuh Three, a character from Codename: Kids Next Door
 a character from Short Circuit
Dale Earnhart's race car, #3
 Number Three (single), a 2012 single by My Chemical Romance

See also
3 (disambiguation)